The Second Lungu Cabinet is the 14th cabinet of Zambia and Second cebinet President Edgar Lungu from 2016 to 2021 they have 33 Cabinet Members 32 Minister and 1 Ex officio member.

List

Key

Minister's 
<noinclude>

References

Government of Zambia
Edgar Lungu
2021 in Zambian politics